Cold Lakes are a pair of glacial tarns in the Ruby Mountains, in Elko County in the northeastern part of the state of Nevada.

The outflow of these lakes are one of the sources for Cold Creek, which after exiting the mountains flows down Lamoille Valley, through the small Lake Phyllis reservoir, and then merges with the main branch of the Humboldt River.

References 

Lakes of Elko County, Nevada
Ruby Mountains
Lakes of Nevada